The Zafisoro are a Malagasy ethnic group inhabiting a portion of the southeastern coast of Madagascar.  
The Zafisoro speak a dialect of the Malagasy language, which is a branch of the Malayo-Polynesian language group derived from the Barito languages, spoken in southern Borneo.

References

Bibliography
  

Ethnic groups in Madagascar